Hugh Thornton Walters (2 March 1939 – 13 February 2015) was a British actor.

During the early 1990s, Hugh Walters appeared regularly on The Russ Abbot Show, and he played a recurring role in the Channel 4 sitcom Chance in a Million. His films include Catch Us If You Can (1965), Jules Verne's Rocket to the Moon (1967), Alfie Darling (1975), George and Mildred (1980), Brimstone and Treacle (1982), The Missionary (1982), 1984 (1984), The Innocent Sleep (1995) and Firelight (1997).

In 1975, Hugh Walters replaced Terry Scully in the role of Vic Thatcher late in the first series of the BBC series Survivors. Scully had appeared in 4 episodes, but then suffered a nervous breakdown, leaving the Survivors production team no choice but to recast the role of Vic with Vic's big episode Revenge coming up. Walters played Vic in episodes 11 and 13 of the first series.was also in an episode of on the buses as the  drunken groom

Filmography 
Catch Us If You Can (1965) - Grey
Doctor Who (1965-1985, TV Series) - William Shakespeare / Runcible / Vogel
Jules Verne's Rocket to the Moon (1967) - Carruthers
Nicholas Nickleby (1968, TV Series) - Smike (Voice) 
The Train Now Standing (1972-1973, TV Series) - Peter Pringle
Alfie Darling (1975) - Hugh, Advertising Man
Survivors (1975, TV Series) - Vic Thatcher 
George and Mildred (1980) - Waiter
The Monster Club (1981) - Art Director (uncredited)
Brimstone and Treacle (1982) - Man
The Missionary (1982) - Fermleigh's Doctor
1984 (1984) - Artsem Lecturer
The Innocent Sleep (1995) - Lewis
Firelight (1997) - Dr. Geddes
Heartbeat (1999-2004, TV Series) - Mr. Jones / Arthur Sykes
Cor, Blimey! (2000, TV Movie) - Charles Hawtrey

References

External links
 
 The Doctor Who Programme Guide, pp. 37, 136
 Obituary
 Doctor Who News - Obituary

English male television actors
1939 births
2015 deaths